In Greek mythology Naïs is the name of the following figures:

 Naïs, the mother of Chiron in one version.
 Naïs, a nymph who used herbs to transform her lovers into various fishes, until she suffered the same fate.
 Naïs, a nymph and the mother of the river-god Achelous by Oceanus.
 Naïs, the mother, in one version, of Glaucus by Poseidon.

References

Bibliography 
 Athenaeus. The Deipnosophists. Or Banquet Of The Learned Of Athenaeus. London. Henry G. Bohn, York Street, Covent Garden. 1854.
 Pseudo-Plutarch, Names of Rivers and Mountains, in Plutarch, The Moralia, translations edited by William Watson Goodwin (1831-1912), from the edition of 1878, a text in the public domain digitized by the Internet Archive and reformatted/lightly corrected by Brady Kiesling.
 Ovid, Metamorphoses, Volume I: Books 1-8. Translated by Frank Justus Miller. Revised by G. P. Goold. Loeb Classical Library 42. Cambridge, MA: Harvard University Press, 1916.

Women in Greek mythology
Metamorphoses into animals in Greek mythology
Nymphs
Women of Poseidon
Metamorphoses characters